Azeem Sarwar may refer to:
 Azeem Sarwar (badminton)
 Azeem Sarwar (broadcaster)